Dynamite Duumvirate Tag Team Title Tournament (2008) was the second Dynamite Duumvirate Tag Team Title Tournament (DDT4) produced by Pro Wrestling Guerrilla (PWG). It was a two-night event, taking place on May 17 and 18, 2008 at the Burbank Armory in Burbank, California.

The 2008 edition of DDT4 marked the first time that the PWG World Tag Team Championship was defended throughout the tournament. Jack Evans and Roderick Strong won the tournament and the titles by defeating the reigning and defending champions Kevin Steen and El Generico in the final.

Production

Background
On January 17, 2008, it was announced that PWG would make Dynamite Duumvirate Tag Team Title Tournament, an annual event after the inaugural tournament took place the previous year. The 2008 edition of DDT4 was scheduled to take place at the Burbank Armory in Burbank, California on May 17 and May 18, 2008.

Storylines
On January 17, it was announced that a round robin tournament would take place between four teams with the winning team qualifying for DDT4. The four teams announced for the series were: Los Luchas (Phoenix Star and Zokre), The Young Bucks (Matt Jackson and Nick Jackson), Ronin and Scorpio Sky, and Hook Bomberry and TJ Perkins. The tournament concluded with a four corners survival match between the four teams at 1.21 Gigawatts. Los Luchas won to become the first team to qualify for DDT4. Ronin and Sky objected to Bomberry and Perkins' dirty tactics which caused their elimination, so they protested over it, leading to Dino Winwood scheduling the two teams to compete in a match at It's A Gift... And A Curse, for a spot in DDT4. Ronin and Sky defeated Bomberry and Perkins to qualify for the tournament.

At 1.21 Gigawatts, El Generico and Kevin Steen defeated The Dynasty (Joey Ryan and Scott Lost) to win the PWG World Tag Team Championship. As a result, both teams were added into DDT4.

Kota Ibushi was scheduled to take part in the tournament, but was forced to back out after suffering a broken ankle. He was replaced by fellow Dramatic Dream Team wrestler El Blazer.

Participants
2.0 (Jagged and Shane Matthews)
Davey Richards and Super Dragon
The Dynasty (Joey Ryan and Scott Lost)
Generation Next (Jack Evans and Roderick Strong)
Mini Crazy MAX (El Blazer and Kagetora)

Results

Tournament brackets

References

External links
Pro Wrestling Guerrilla official website

Dynamite Duumvirate Tag Team Title Tournament
2008 in professional wrestling
May 2008 sports events in the United States
2008 in California
Professional wrestling in California